Joseph Sun may refer to:

Joseph Sun Yuanmo (1920–2006), Chinese Roman Catholic bishop
Joseph Sun Jigen (born 1967), Chinese Roman Catholic bishop

See also
Joe Sun (1943–2019), American country music singer
Joseph Sung (born 1959), Hong Kong gastroenterologist
Joseph Son (disambiguation)